Niantoule  is a village in the Bassar Prefecture in the Kara Region  of north-western Togo.

References

Populated places in Kara Region
Bassar Prefecture